Murji'ah (English: "Those Who Postpone"), also known as Murji'as or Murji'ites, were an early Islamic sect. Murji'ah held the opinion that God alone has the right to judge whether or not a Muslim has become an apostate. Consequently Muslims should practice postponement (ʾirjāʾ) of judgment on committers of major sins and not make charges of disbelief (’takfir’) or punish  accordingly anyone who has professed Islam to be their faith. They also believed that good deeds or omission of them do not affect a person's faith, and a person who did no other act of obedience would not be punished in the afterlife as long as they held onto pure faith. They used to say that "disobedience does not harm faith as good deeds do not help with disbelief." The members of the Murjite Order continue to adhere to this school.

The emergence 

During the early centuries of Islam, Muslim thought encountered a multitude of influences from various ethnic and philosophical groups that it absorbed. This group emerged as a result of the controversy around the assassinations of the Rashidun caliphs Uthman ibn Affan and Ali ibn abi Talib. The Murji'ah emerged as a theological school that was opposed to the Kharijites on questions related to early controversies regarding sin and definitions of what is a true Muslim. The Khawarij believed that committing a sin amounted to leaving Islam and the Murji'ah reacted with the opposite extreme, that deeds not only do not result in leaving Islam, but do not affect one's faith at all.

As opposed to the Kharijites, Murjites advocated the idea of deferring judgment of other peoples' belief. The word Murjiah itself means "one who postpones" in Arabic. Murjite doctrine held that only God has the authority to judge who is a true Muslim and who is not, and that Muslims should consider all other Muslims as part of the community. This theology promoted tolerance of Umayyads and converts to Islam who appeared halfhearted in their obedience. They urged unity among Muslims, and their conciliatory principles made them popular.

Beliefs on major sin 

In another contrast to the Kharijites, who believed that committing a major sin would render a person non-Muslim, Murjites considered genuine belief in and submission to God to be more important than acts of piety and good works. They believed Muslims committing major sins would remain Muslim and be eligible for paradise if they remained faithful. Conversely, those engaging in  shirk cannot benefit salvation from performing good acts. Thus, faith is paramount.

The Murjite opinion on the issue of whether one committing a major sin remains a believer was adopted with modifications by the later theological schools – Maturidi, Ash'ari and Muʿtazila

Legacy 
Abu Hanifa, founder of the Hanafi (c. 699–767) school of Sunni jurisprudence, was often associated with the Murji'ah. In his al-Fiqh al-Akbar I he lay down probably the oldest surviving work regarding early Muslim creed, advocating respect for all the companions of Muhammad, withholding judgment regarding Uthman and Ali and predeterminism. His works were fundamental to later Sunni theology, Hanbalism being an exception.

See also
Islamic theology
Al-Harith ibn Surayj
Khawarij

Bibliography

References

Arabic words and phrases
Islamic branches